"The War Prayer" is the seventh episode of the first season of the science fiction television series, Babylon 5. It first aired on 9 March 1994.

Plot
A string of attacks on aliens has occurred on Babylon 5, the latest being the stabbing and branding of Minbari poet, Shaal Mayan. Commander Sinclair is pressured by Minbari ambassador Delenn to find the culprit, and he orders Security Chief Garibaldi to investigate in depth. Narn ambassador G'kar, however, insists more action must be done, and beings to rally the other aliens aboard, creating a tense situation.

Meanwhile, Centauri ambassador Londo Mollari must deal with his aide Vir Cotto's cousin Kiron and his girlfriend Aria, who have fled the Centauri homeworld as they have been arranged to be wed into different families. Mollari asserts that it is Centauri morals for assigned marriages, love having no place in their society. That evening, Kiron and Aria are attacked in a similar manner to the previous attack, leaving Kiron in a coma.

Elsewhere, Ivanova discovers that her former associate from the academy, Malcolm Biggs, has arrived on the station. While he remains secretive as to his business reasons for being there, Malcolm does express interest in rekindling his relationship with Ivanova.

Aria stays by Kiron's side, but Mollari suggests that there is no point in Aria waiting around should Kiron die. After Aria leaves, Shaal talks to Mollari about love, and that that from her writings, she found that the measure of a value of a person is how much capacity they have to love and love others. Vir finds Mollari later: Mollari tells Vir a tale from his father who had complained that his shoes were too tight, but it did not matter as he had forgotten how to dance; Mollari now feels the same way.

When Kiron wakes, Mollari gladly tells him and Aria that he has arranged for the two to return to Centauri Prime and stay with his cousin, a powerful figure in the government, to be schooled in Centauri customs in such that when they are old enough, they will be able to choose who they can marry.  This solution pleases both them and Vir.

Ivanova brings Malcolm to a reception where Sinclair purposely speaks out against the alien presence. Malcolm later invites Sinclair and Ivanova to a meeting, there introducing them to his agents that have been behind the attacks. Malcolm explains their intent to assassinate the four key ambassadors on Babylon 5 in an attempt to force the alien ambassadors off Earth. Sinclair and Ivanova turn on Malcolm and his men, as security officers arrive to arrest them.

As they are taken off the station, Ivanova expresses her resentment to Malcolm for the direction he has taken.

Production

Cast
The Home Guard leader Malcolm Biggs was played by Australian-American actor Tristan Rogers, best known for playing Robert Scorpio in General Hospital. Earlier, he played roles in a number of prominent Australian serials such as Number 96, Bellbird. and The Box.  In 2019 he won a Daytime Emmy Award for his role as Doc in the series Studio City.

Minbari poet Shaal Mayan was played by Nancy Lee Grahn, who also appears in General Hospital, playing Alexis Davis, winning a Daytime Emmy Award in 2012.  Grahn also starred as Julia Wainwright Capwell on Santa Barbara, winning an Emmy Award in 1989.

Vir's cousin Kiron Maray was played by Canadian actor Rodney Eastman, best known for playing Joey Crusel in the A Nightmare on Elm Street film series.  He is also a musician with the Los Angeles band King Straggler with fellow actors John Hawkes and Brentley Gore.

Kiron's girlfriend Aria Tensus was played by actress, mathematician and mathematics educator Danica McKellar. McKellar played Winnie Cooper in The Wonder Years, and Elsie Snuffin in The West Wing. In 1997 she co-authored an academic paper on the statistical analysis of magnetic properties of materials, and has authored several mathematics books for children and secondary school students, some being New York Times bestsellers.

American actor Michael Paul Chan played Roberts, the man picked by as a suspect in the attack on Shaal Mayan. Chan is known for playing the role of Lieutenant Michael Tao in The Closer and Major Crimes.  He also played roles in The Goonies, Batman Forever, Batman & Robin and Falling Down.

Music, sound and visual effects
The Babylon 5 makeup department involved in this episode – consisting of Everett Burrell, Greg Funk, Mary Kay Morse, Ron Pipes and John Vulich – won the 1994 Emmy Award for Outstanding Individual Achievement in Makeup for a Series for episode 5 of the season, "The Parliament of Dreams"

The design for the Vorlon ambassador, Kosh was created by Steve Burg for the pilot episode. Due to Kosh's encounter suit costume being too large for the set doors, the character was never shown entering or leaving through a door.

For its visual effects scenes, Babylon 5 pioneered the use of computer-generated imagery (CGI) scenes – instead of using more expensive physical models – in a television series.<ref name="Britt">{{cite web |url=https://www.syfy.com/syfywire/5-things-babylon-5-did-that-changed-science-fiction-forever |title=5 Things that Babylon 5 did that changed science fiction forever. |last=Britt |first=Ryan |date=11 July 2019 |website=www.syfy.com |publisher=SYFY Media LLC. |access-date= |url-status=dead |archive-url=https://web.archive.org/web/20211009164702/https://www.syfy.com/syfywire/5-things-babylon-5-did-that-changed-science-fiction-forever |archive-date= 2021-10-09 |quote=And though this may seem shocking now, in the early and mid-'90s, CGI was not the default for sci-fi special effects. Most big sci-fi shows and movies (like Star Trek) all still used physical models, which are notoriously more expensive. But all of Babylon 5'''s spaceships and space stations were made in a computer.}}</ref> This also enabled motion effects which are difficult to create using models, such as the rotation of fighter craft along multiple axes, or the rotation and banking of a virtual camera. The visual effects were created by Foundation Imaging using 24 Commodore Amiga 2000 computers with Lightwave 3D software and Video Toaster cards, 16 of which were dedicated to rending each individual frame of CGI, with each frame taking on average 45 minutes to render. In-house resource management software managed the workload of the Amiga computers to ensure that no machine was left idle during the image rendering process.

Music for the title sequence and the episode was provided by the series' composer, Christopher Franke. Franke developed themes for each of the main characters, the station, for space in general, and for the alien races, endeavoring to carry a sense of the character of each race. The voice effects for the Vorlon ambassador Kosh, were also designed by Franke, with the character voiced by Ardwight Chamberlain.

Writing

Regarding Mark Twain, Straczynski wrote, "He's always been a seminal influence on my work. I have pretty much everything he's ever written, absent the five volume set of his journals that's only available to libraries. 'The Man Who Corrupted Hadleyburg' is still one of my favorite pieces, as is 'The War Prayer,' leading to its nod in B5."

As Babylon 5 was conceived with an overall five-year story arc, the episode was written as both an individual story and with another level, where the hints of the larger story arc were given. The series' creator, J. Michael Straczynski indicates that the episodes can be watched for the individual stories, the character stories, or the story arc.

The episode was written by D.C. Fontana who has written episodes for many television series, including a large number of episodes for various Star Trek series. Fontana was a writer for the Star Trek: The Next Generation pilot episode, "Encounter at Farpoint." She also wrote two other Babylon 5 scripts, "Legacies" and "A Distant Star". Fontana wrote the episode, based on a premise by Straczynski the series creator. Only the pilot was available for research purposes, so she spent some time speaking with Straczynski to get a feel for the series.

Reviews
Rowan Kaiser, writing in The A.V. Club, notes that the episode develops the idea that human culture in the year 2258 isn't entirely pleasant. Kaiser writes, "This isn't a necessary revelation after 'Infection' and 'Mind War', but it's not meant to be a revelation—it's a premise."

Kaiser also identifies the theme of regret appearing throughout the episode. He writes, "Ivanova has regrets, though she claims not to, about leaving Malcolm eight years prior. Delenn has a conversation with her friend, where she's asked 'Do you regret the choices that you've made?' 'Sometimes,' responds Delenn, but she makes it clear that those don't define her. Londo, on the other hand, lets his regrets define him. 'My shoes are too tight. But it does not matter, for I have forgotten how to dance,' he tells Vir, as a metaphor for him forgetting himself in favor of tradition, of propriety, and of power."

Elias Rosner, writing in the Multiversity Comics website, also singles out this scene, with Londo discussing with Vir about what it means to be trapped in his own ways, to have forgotten what it is to be young. Rosner observes, "It's a profound scene that's the right balance of clarity and mystique. Londo's words carry all the weight in the world and in that moment, we understand where he is and what he is thinking. [...] It's a fantastic bit of dialogue that is revealing in all the right ways."<ref name="Rosner">{{cite web |url=http://www.multiversitycomics.com/tv/babylon-5-war-prayer/|title='Five Thoughts on Babylon 5's "The War Prayer."' |last=Rosner |first=Elias |date=4 July 2018 |website=Multiversity Comics |publisher=Matthew Meylikhov |access-date= }}</ref>

References

External linksThe War Prayer'' text of 1905 piece by Mark Twain

Babylon 5 episodes
1994 American television episodes